Joseph Gardiner (23 August 1916 – 1997) was an English footballer, who served Wolverhampton Wanderers as both player and coach.

Career
Gardiner joined Wolverhampton Wanderers in December 1932, signing professionally the following year before making his league debut on 23 February 1935 in a 2–5 loss at Black Country rivals West Bromwich Albion.

He originally joined as a centre-forward but was converted to a centre-back, as he became a first choice player in the seasons preceding World War II. He appeared in the 1939 FA Cup Final for the club, where they lost to Portsmouth in the Wembley showpiece. He also narrowly missed out on glory in the league championship as the club finished runners-up for two successive seasons in the late 1930s.

He remained with the club while the Football League was suspended during wartime, turning out in regional action. He announced his playing retirement in May 1944 but remained on the coaching staff. He was the club's main trainer in the Stan Cullis era as the club became one of the great sides of Europe, winning three league titles and two FA Cups.
He was named chief scout in 1966, and helped discover the likes of John Richards.

He died in 1997.

Honours
Wolverhampton Wanderers
FA Cup finalist: 1939

1916 births
1997 deaths
Footballers from County Durham
English footballers
English Football League players
Wolverhampton Wanderers F.C. players
English Football League representative players
Association football defenders
Wolverhampton Wanderers F.C. non-playing staff
Birmingham City F.C. non-playing staff
People from Bearpark
FA Cup Final players